Hampapura is a small village in Mysore, Karnataka province, India.

Location

Demographics
As of 2011, there are 4288 people living in Hampapura village, with 2121 being male and 2167 being female. In 2011, children formed 9% of the village population. The overall literacy rate of the village is 70%, however, the female literacy rate remains smaller, being reported at 62%. There are 1,024 houses in the village.

Post Office
The post office in Hampapura has the postal code of 571125.

References

Villages in Mysore district